Beccariella is a genus of flowering plants in the family Sapotaceae. This genus consists of at least 30 species of evergreen trees± found around the Pacific in the subtropics and tropics, mainly from Indonesia and Malaysia to northern Australia. They have simple leathery leaves, usually elliptical and glossy, they are basically deep green but often suffused with other colors. The stems and leaves contain latex, which may cause an irritant dermatitis in some people. The flowers are paired or in clusters and are very small; the ovoid fruits that follow are sometimes more conspicuous.

Cultivation  
They are tolerant of frost and prefer warm humid conditions with moist soil rich in humus. Propagate from seed or cuttings.

Species

Beccariella aylapi
Beccariella azouBeccariella balansana
Beccariella balitbitan
Beccariella baueri
Beccariella brevipedicellata syn. Pouteria brevipedicellata
Beccariella brownlessiana
Beccariella celebica
Beccariella cesati
Beccariella chartacea
Beccariella coriacea
Beccariella crebrifolia
Beccariella dubia
Beccariella duclitan
Beccariella firma
Beccariella insignis
Beccariella kingiana
Beccariella lasiantha
Beccariella laurifolia
Beccariella longipetiolata
Beccariella lucens
Beccariella meripilaceae
Beccariella microcarpa
Beccariella moluccana
Beccariella novo-caledonica
Beccariella papuanica
Beccariella papyracea
Beccariella pierre
Beccariella queenslandica
Beccariella rubicunda
Beccariella schlechteri
Beccariella sebertii
Beccariella trailii
Beccariella vieillardii
Beccariella xerocarpa

References
Lord, Tony (2003) Flora : The Gardener's Bible : More than 20,000 garden plants from around the world. London: Cassell.  

Chrysophylloideae
Sapotaceae genera